Organic solute transporter alpha, also known as OST-alpha, is a protein which in humans is encoded by the SLC51A gene.

Function 

OST-alpha together with OST-beta is able to transport estrone sulfate, taurocholate, digoxin, and prostaglandin E2 across cell membranes. The Ost-alpha / Ost-beta heterodimer, but not the individual subunits, stimulates sodium-independent bile acid uptake. The heterodimer furthermore is essential for intestinal bile acid transport.

OST-alpha and OST-alpha have high expression in the testis, colon, liver, small intestine, kidney, ovary, and adrenal gland.

See also
OSTbeta
OST Family
Transporter Classification Database

References

Further reading